Discula bulverii is a species of air-breathing land snail, a terrestrial pulmonate gastropod mollusk in the family Geomitridae.

This species is endemic to Porto Santo Island, Madeira, Portugal.

References

bulverii
Molluscs of Madeira
Endemic fauna of Madeira
Gastropods described in 1828
Taxonomy articles created by Polbot
Taxobox binomials not recognized by IUCN